The  is a river in Iwate Prefecture, Japan. From its headwaters near Mt. Waga in the Ōu Mountains it flows from north to south through the entire length of Nishiwaga Town before turning east through Kitakami City. The River enters the Kitakami River on the south side of the city opposite Mt. Otoko.

Located at the head of the Geto River is Geto Onsen and Geto Ski Area, both popular attractions.

History 

In prehistoric times the Waga River valley was occupied by the Jōmon people whose artifacts can be found in many places. One of the more famous sites is at  where the Waga River meets the Kitakami River. Stone "swords", tablets and tools as well as clay figurines, earrings, potsherds and even a shark's tooth were found from the Final Jōmon Period (1,300 - 300 BC).

In 1945 a small prisoner of war camp was established on the south side of the river in the area now known as Lake Kinshu. In the same year a small aircraft factory was built in some caves on the north side of the river near the Ishibane Dam.

Ishibane Dam was completed in just two years in 1954 on the Waga River in western Kitakami. While this construction was underway in 1953 work started upriver on the Yuda Dam  in the town of Nishiwaga. It was completed in 1964 creating a much larger reservoir, . On the Geto River construction of the Irihata Dam lasted from 1974 to 1990.

Gallery

External links

Rivers of Iwate Prefecture
Nishiwaga, Iwate
Kitakami, Iwate
Rivers of Japan